Turaida is name of the main hillfort of the former Livonian county Turaida, which nowadays is a part of Sigulda in Latvia.

Other places named or referred to as "Turaida" include:

 Turaida Castle in Latvia.

Other:
Rose of Turaida
Caupo of Turaida
Battle of Turaida
Battle of Turaida (1211)